Hagerman is a surname. Notable people with the surname include:

Barbara Oliver Hagerman (1943–2016), Canadian classical musician
Betty Sue Hagerman, American tennis coach
Christopher Alexander Hagerman (1792–1847), Canadian politician and judge
Daniel Hagerman (1794–1821), Canadian lawyer and politician
Douglas Hagerman (born 1960), American businessman
Helge Hagerman (1910–1995), Swedish actor and film producer
Herbert James Hagerman (1871–1935), American lawyer and politician
J. J. Hagerman (1838–1909), American industrialist
Jamie Hagerman (born 1981), American ice hockey player
John Hagerman (1881–1960), American long jumper and triple jumper
Oscar Hagerman (born 1936), Mexican architect
Rip Hagerman (1888–1930), American baseball player